"Dear Summer" is the third and final single from American rapper Memphis Bleek's fourth studio album, 534. Despite being featured on Bleek's album and released as a single, the song does not feature any vocals from Memphis Bleek. He is also not listed as a writer. It is solely performed by the featured guest, Jay-Z. Produced by Just Blaze, it contains a sample from Weldon Irvine's "Morning Sunrise". It is notable for being the first Jay-Z song to be released following his retirement from music in the summer of 2003.

The song peaked at number 30 on the Hot R&B/Hip-Hop Songs chart.

References

2005 singles
Jay-Z songs
Song recordings produced by Just Blaze
Songs written by Jay-Z
Roc-A-Fella Records singles
Songs written by Just Blaze
2005 songs